Du Bin (born 1972) is a Chinese journalist, photographer, poet and documentary film-maker. Self-taught in photography, Du has worked as a contract photographer for The New York Times since 2011, and has also been published in the International Herald Tribune, Time, and the Guardian. He is originally from Tancheng, Shandong, China, and is based in Beijing. Du was detained by Beijing authorities in June 2013 after releasing a feature-length documentary about the Masanjia Labor Camp.

Notable works

Du wrote the first biography of the artist Ai Weiwei, called God Ai.

In 2013 he released Above the Ghosts' Head: The Women of Masanjia Labour Camp, a documentary on torture and other abuses in China's Masanjia Labor Camp. The film was banned in mainland China, but was shown at least once in Hong Kong and Taiwan, and then posted online. He also had a 600-page book on the 1989 military crackdown published, called Tiananmen Square Massacre. The book, which compiles a number of already published accounts of 4 June crackdown, was published in late May by Mirror Books.

2013 detention
On 1 June 2013, soon after the release of the book and the film, Du Bin was detained by state security agents in Beijing. Friends say that they found two unsigned police warrants in his home for "disturbing public order." Under Chinese administrative statutes, police could use the charge to hold Du for up to 15 days, after which he should either be released, sent to a re-education through labor camp, or formally charged with a crime. As of 13 June, Du was still being held at the Fengtai District detention center. Amnesty International and Reporters Without Borders called for his release.

Du Bin was released on bail on 8 July 2013, but his freedom is tenuous. He could still face formal charges for "picking quarrels and making trouble," and he expects that his movements will be monitored. The Chinese government has censored his name from Sina Weibo.

2020 detention
Du Bin was detained in December 2020. He was charged with "picking quarrels and provoking trouble" and is being held at a detention centre in Daxing District. His family had been warned not to speak to the media. He was detained a month before his book on Vladimir Lenin was due to be released. The Committee to Protect Journalists have called for his release.

Books
 Petitioners: Living Fossils Who Survived China's Rule of Law (上訪者 : 中國以法治國下倖存的活化石)(2007)  
 Shanghai Calvary (2010)  
 Beijing's Ghosts (2010) 
 Toothbrush (牙刷 : 紅色星球上人類最後的進化) (2011) 
 Chairman Mao's Purgatory (2011) 
 God Ai (2012)  
 Mao Zedong's Regime of Human Flesh (2013)  
 Tiananmen Square Massacre (2013) 
 Vaginal Coma (2014)
 Roar of Masanjia (2015)
 Changchun Hunger Siege 1947.11.4-1948.10.19 (2017)

External links
 Above the Ghosts' Head: The Women of Masanjia Labour Camp
 Amnesty International article
 PDF download of Toothbrush in Chinese and English

References

Writers from Linyi
Film directors from Shandong
Chinese photographers
1972 births
Living people
Chinese prisoners and detainees
Prisoners and detainees of the People's Republic of China
People's Republic of China journalists
People's Republic of China poets
Poets from Shandong
Chinese film directors